Pucky Ali (born Masood Ali) is a former Indian film actor. He is the eldest son of India's ace comedian Mehmood Ali and elder brother of singer Lucky Ali.

Early and personal life
Ali is the first of the eight children of the popular Bollywood actor, Mehmood. His mother Mahelaka, was part Bengali and part Pathan, the sister of the popular Indian actress of the 1960s – Meena Kumari. The Bollywood actress and dancer, Minoo Mumtaz, is his paternal aunt. Masood has two children, Mahir and Maseeha. Ali retired from the film industry due to disinterest and currently resides in Bengaluru, Karnataka.

Career
Pucky Ali acted in the 1978 movie Ek Baap Chhe Bete, starring his father along with all his brothers and Hamare Tumhare, which was also the debut movie for Anil Kapoor in 1979. He played the role of AK Hangal's son "Anwar" in the 1982 movie Khud-Daar, credited as "Ali Masood".

See also 
 Mehmood Ali Family
 Minoo Mumtaz
 List of Hindi film clans

References

External links
 

20th-century Indian male actors
Male actors from Mumbai
Living people
Male actors in Hindi cinema
1954 births